Toni Stoichkov (born 10 November 1995) is a Bulgarian footballer who plays as a central defender for Marek Dupnitsa.

Career
In 2012, he joined CSKA Sofia's first team from the youth team.

In January 2017, Stoichkov signed for Bansko. He moved to CSKA 1948 on 14 June 2017.

Career statistics

Club

References

External links
Profile at sportal.bg

1995 births
Living people
Bulgarian footballers
First Professional Football League (Bulgaria) players
PFC CSKA Sofia players
PFC Cherno More Varna players
FC Bansko players
FC CSKA 1948 Sofia players
PFC Minyor Pernik players
PFC Marek Dupnitsa players
Association football defenders